Homunculus Parts 1-4 + Ritual is a compilation album by German electronic composer Peter Frohmader, released in 1995 by Multimood Records. It comprises three of Frohmader's albums, Ritual, Homunculus, Vol. 1 and Homunculus, Vol. 2, all recorded in 1985.

Track listing

Personnel
Adapted from the Homunculus Parts 1-4 + Ritual liner notes.
 Iva Bittova – violin (1.3, 2.1)
 Peter Frohmader – electronics, musical arrangement, production, engineering, mixing, cover art
 Chris Karrer – violin, oud, alto saxophone (1.3, 2.1)
 Stephan Manus – violin (2.2, 2.5)
 Birgit Metzger – vocals (1.1, 1.2)
 Stefan Plett – alto saxophone (2.8, 2.9)
 Norbert Preisler – acoustic guitar (1.3, 2.1)
 Steffen Seithel – oboe (1.3, 2.1)

Release history

References 

1995 compilation albums
Peter Frohmader albums